Indigofera suffruticosa, commonly known as Guatemalan indigo, small-leaved indigo (Sierra Leone), West Indian indigo, wild indigo, and anil, is a flowering plant in the pea family, Fabaceae.

Anil is native to the subtropical and tropical Americas, including the southern United States, the Caribbean, Mexico, Central America, and South America as far south as northern Argentina. This species has been widely introduced to other parts of the world and today has a pantropical distribution.

Anil is commonly used as a source for indigo dye, and if mixed with Palygorskite clays, can produce Maya blue, a pigment used by the Mesoamerican civilizations.

References

suffruticosa
Plant dyes
Flora of the Caribbean
Flora of Central America
Flora of Mexico
Flora of South America
Flora of the Southeastern United States
Flora of Texas
Plants described in 1768
Natural history of Mesoamerica
Pantropical flora
Taxa named by Philip Miller
Flora without expected TNC conservation status